Parasyrphus currani is a species of syrphid fly in the family Syrphidae.

References

Syrphinae
Syrphini
Articles created by Qbugbot
Insects described in 1935